A flowerpot is a container in which flowers and other plants are cultivated and displayed.

Flowerpot or flower pot may also refer to:

 Flowerpot, Tasmania, a locality in Australia
 Flowerpot Bay, Chatham Islands, New Zealand
 Flowerpot Island, Ontario, Canada
 Flowerpot Men (disambiguation)
 Flowerpot parasol,  a species of gilled mushroom (Leucocoprinus birnbaumii)
 Flowerpot Snake, a blind snake species found in Africa and Asia (Ramphotyphlops braminus)
 Flowerpot technique, used in sleep deprivation studies

See also
 The Baby Girl and the Flowerpot, Vietnamese short animated film
 Jade Flowerpots and Bound Feet, American short play